Basin is an unincorporated community in Coffee County, Alabama, United States.

References

Unincorporated communities in Coffee County, Alabama
Unincorporated communities in Alabama